Rex Roy Cramphorn (sometimes identified by the variant Cramphorne) (10 January 194122 November 1991) was an Australian theatre director, costume designer, theatre critic, theorist and translator, active in the 1970s and 1980s.

Freelance director and theatre critic 
Cramphorn was one of a generation of theatre directors who emerged in Australia in the 1960s.  He aspired to establish a permanent Australian performance ensemble, multi-skilled and committed, such as had been done by the Polish theatre guru Jerzy Grotowski with whom he worked for a time, but there was not the audience, the assured funding nor the interest in Cramphorn's preference for non-commercial projects to achieve this.

As a freelance director he was involved in some 55 theatre productions around Australia in the 1970s and 1980s. He was resident director at Melbourne's Playbox Theatre in the early 1980s.

The best of Cramphorn's theatre productions were said to be the equal of any Grotowski production; in others it was evident that Cramphorn seemed to demand almost as much of his audience as he did of his players.  In a 1973 interview, Cramphorn described the kind of productions he hoped to create: -

As a theatre critic during the early 1970s, Cramphorn contributed 110 theatre reviews to several newspapers. In these forthright, uncompromising and scholarly reviews, Cramphorn indicated initially that there was little that pleased him in the Sydney theatre scene, a view summarised by his metaphor ‘a withering mistletoe on our gum-tree culture’.  He hailed, however, the emergence of new talents such at Louis Nowra and John Bell.

Costume designer 
Cramphorn designed the costumes for the musical Jesus Christ Superstar and many of his own productions. One of Cramphorn's earliest projects was at the 1968 Festival of Perth, where he designed the costumes for Aarne Neeme and Philip Parsons’ production of Richard III at the New Fortune Theatre (University of Western Australia).

Personal life 
Cramphorn was born in Brisbane, Australia and attended Brisbane Boys' College. His tertiary education was at the University of New South Wales: MA in Drama, University of Queensland: BA Hons in French and English studies, graduate of the National Institute of Dramatic Art: 1967 (named as Cramphorne) and the Australian Film TV and Radio school.

Many men and women fell for Cramphorn. His capacity for empathising with actors, encyclopaedic knowledge especially of all things French, and "large pocket-Adonis" good looks  prompted many to seek his personal commitment. Most remained his friends, however, long after he had persuaded them, gently, that they could be no more than that. At age 20 he inspired a poem containing this stanza: -

           You may love the boy and lay him
           naked across your knees
           and kiss him and make him laugh
           but it isn't you he sees

Death and commemoration 
Cramphorn died in Sydney, 22 November 1991 of AIDS related causes, aged 50.
Glowing tributes and obituary notices began to appear, in contrast to the faltering recognition Cramphorn had received in life.  In them may be read assessments such as: -

 this most intelligent, gentle and well-read of Australian directors 
 the only real philosopher the Australian theatre has produced
 Australian theatre has lost one of its most challenging and sensitive talents
 that rare and important figure, a philosopher and visionary of the arts
 the most formally innovative director this country has ever produced
 the most original director of his generation, and certainly the most rigorous and uncompromising.
 I had the pleasure of working with Rex on several projects and will certainly add to this tribute.

Among Cramphorn's effects were thirty boxes of papers which he bequeathed to the Department of Performance Studies at the University of Sydney.   Selections from this archive form the basis for Associate Professor Ian Maxwell's publication A Raffish Experiment – The Selected Writings of Rex Cramphorn published by Currency Press in 2009.

A biennial $30,000 Rex Cramphorn Theatre Scholarship has been established by the New South Wales Government. and the Australian Film TV and Radio school.
An annual series of Rex Cramphorn lectures – a memorial set up by his friends and colleagues - was begun in 1995, Jim Sharman giving the first lecture.

A studio in the University of Sydney's Centre for Performance Studies has been named in his honour (popularly known as "The Rex").

References 

1941 births
1991 deaths
People educated at Brisbane Boys' College
Australian theatre directors